Giallo is an Italian free television channel owned by Warner Bros. Discovery EMEA.

History

Switchover Media management (2012–2013) 
On 7 May 2012, Giallo replaced the CanalOne broadcasts with a sign announcing the launch of the channel, in which the protagonists wrote sentences on a wall (with reference to the "chromatic" idioms of the Italian language), then erased with yellow paint, occurred on May 14 at 4:00 pm by Switchover Media.

Discovery Italia management (2013–2022) 
Since 14 January 2013, the channel has been produced by Discovery Italia, after the acquisition of the latter by the publisher Switchover Media.
From 9 April 2014, Giallo also transmits via satellite on Sky Italia at channel 144. Three days later the channel renews its logo and graphics and also changes its position, moving to the top left.
From 6 February of the same year, the transparent "D" is added to the left of the logo. The same thing for the other free channels belonging to Discovery, from 23 July of the same year, Giallo also broadcasts on Tivù Sat to channel 38.

From 10 April 2020, as also happened on Real Time, the superimposed logo has undergone some changes, becoming monochromatic and with the Discovery logo in full in place of the D-globe.

Programming
 Crossing Jordan
 Law & Order
 Law & Order: Trial by Jury
 Law & Order: LA
 Lie to Me
 Broadchurch
 The Chicago Code
 The Guardian
 Cracked
 Cherif
 DCI Banks
 Ties That Bind
 And Then There Were None
 Fairly Legal
 Hinterland
 Grantchester
 The Brokenwood Mysteries
 The Finder
 The Firm
 Nightmares & Dreamscapes: From the Stories of Stephen King
 Josephine Klick - Allein unter Cops
 Midsomer Murders
 Murdoch Mysteries
 King
 Paris enquêtes criminelles
 Law & Order: UK
 The Listener
 Matlock
 Vermist
 Night Stalker
 New Tricks
 Morden i Sandhamn
 Post Mortem
 Scott & Bailey
 The Protector
 Ripper Street
 Silent Witness
 Tandem
 The Missing
 Touch
 Waking the Dead
 Whitechapel
 Vera

References

External links

Italian-language television stations
Warner Bros. Discovery networks
Television channels and stations established in 2012